Days of Dreams (translit. Dani od snova) is a 1980 Yugoslav drama film directed by Vlatko Gilić. It competed in the Un Certain Regard section at the 1980 Cannes Film Festival.

Cast
 Vladislava Milosavljević
 Boris Komnenić
 Ljiljana Krstić
 Svetozar Cvetković

References

External links

1980 films
1980 drama films
Serbo-Croatian-language films
Serbian drama films
Yugoslav drama films
Films set in Yugoslavia
Films set in Serbia
1980s Serbian-language films